Down with It! is an album by American trumpeter Blue Mitchell, recorded in 1965 and released on the Blue Note label.

Reception

The Allmusic review by Stephen Thomas Erlewine awarded the album 4 stars and stated "the record is so relaxed that it fails to generate much spark, but each the soloists have fine moments that makes the session worthwhile for jazz purists".

Track listing
 "Hi-Heel Sneakers" (Robert Higginbotham) – 8:23
 "Perception" (Chick Corea, Blue Mitchell) – 5:41
 "Alone, Alone, and Alone" (Terumasa Hino) – 7:45
 "March on Selma" (Mitchell) – 6:16
 "One Shirt" (William Boone) – 7:30
 "Samba de Stacy" (Boone) – 5:59

Personnel
Blue Mitchell – trumpet
Junior Cook – tenor saxophone
Chick Corea – piano
Gene Taylor – bass
Al Foster – drums

References

Blue Note Records albums
Blue Mitchell albums
1966 albums
Albums recorded at Van Gelder Studio
Albums produced by Alfred Lion